Michael DeAngelis (born 27 January 1966) is a Canadian-born, Italian ice hockey coach, scout and former player. He competed in the men's tournaments at the 1992 Winter Olympics, the 1994 Winter Olympics and the 1998 Winter Olympics for Italy.

Statistics

International

Awards and honors

References

External links
 

1966 births
Living people
Olympic ice hockey players of Italy
Ice hockey players at the 1992 Winter Olympics
Ice hockey players at the 1994 Winter Olympics
Ice hockey players at the 1998 Winter Olympics
Ice hockey people from Ontario
Minnesota Duluth Bulldogs men's ice hockey players
Kalamazoo Wings (1974–2000) players
Asiago Hockey 1935 players
Tacoma Sabercats players
Phoenix Mustangs players